NC may refer to:

People
 Naga Chaitanya, an Indian Telugu film actor; sometimes nicknamed by the initials of his first and middle name, NC
 Nathan Connolly, lead guitarist for Snow Patrol
Nostalgia Critic, the alter ego of Internet comedian Doug Walker from That Guy with the Glasses

Places
 New Caledonia, special collectivity of France (ISO 3166-1 country code NC)
 New Canaan, a town in Connecticut, U.S.
 North Carolina, a U.S. state by postal abbreviation
 Northern Cyprus, a self-declared state on the island of Cyprus

Science, technology, and mathematics

Biology and medicine
 Nasal cannula, a device used to deliver supplemental oxygen
 Neural crest, a transient component of the ectoderm
 Effective number of codons, a measure to study the state of codon usage biases in genes

Chemistry 

 (-NC) Isocyanide, an organic functional group.

Computing and internet
 NC (complexity), the set of decision problems decidable in polylogarithmic time on a parallel computer with a polynomial number of processors
Naming Context, in Microsoft Active Directory
NCsoft, a producer of MMORPGs such as Lineage
Netcat, a computer network utility
Network computer, a diskless desktop computer in the late 1990s
Norton Commander, an orthodox file manager program
PernMUSH, an online game based on Anne McCaffrey's Pern novels

Physics and materials
 Nanocarbon, a short name for material based on carbon nanotubes
 Nanocoulomb, 1: of the SI unit of electric charge
 Neutral current, a class of physics interaction where the mediating boson is neutral, especially for neutrino experiments
 Nuclear chemistry, the subfield of chemistry dealing with radioactivity, nuclear processes and nuclear properties

Mathematics
 nc (elliptic function), one of Jacobi's elliptic functions

Other uses in science and technology
 National coarse, a Unified Thread Standard for screws, nuts, and bolts
 National Radio Company, American manufacturer of radio equipment from 1914 to 1991
 Noise criteria, a single-value measurement of background noise derived from a graphic representation of the sound pressure audio spectrum (noise curves)
 Noun class, a grammatical category of nouns
 Normally closed, an electrical switch where the default position is closed
 Numerical control, a method of automatic operation of machine tools
 NC MX-5 Miata, the third generation of the Mazda MX-5

Transport
 Northern Air Cargo, an American cargo airline (IATA designator NC)
 National Jet Systems, an Australian charter airline (IATA designator NC)
 Curtiss NC, an American flying boat nicknamed the "Nancy boat"
 NC-4, the first aircraft to cross the atlantic (with multiple stops)
 NC, an international maritime distress signal

Other uses
 NC-17, an MPAA film rating system code indicating that children under 17 are not admitted
 National Certificate, an educational award in various countries including Ireland and Scotland
 National Coalition for Syrian Revolutionary and Opposition Forces or National Coalition, a Syrian revolutionary organisation
 Nehru Centre, Mumbai, India
 New Centre, a former political party in France now known as The Centrists
 New Conglomerate (NC), a faction in the PlanetSide series
 New Continent School (Colegio Nuevo Continente), a private school in Mexico
 No comment, in internet slang
 No contest (combat sports)
 Non Cognizable Offense, in law
 Nepali Congress, a political party in Nepal
 Nepali Congress (Democratic)
 Nepali Congress (Rastrabadi)
 N.C., "no chord" in guitar tablature
 Nonconformity (quality), in Quality management
 Noncommercial (in Creative Commons licenses)